The rivière aux Rats (from muskrat) is a watercourse crossing the borough Chicoutimi sector, at Saguenay (city) (Quebec, Canada). At  in length, it is a minor tributary of the Saguenay River.

The surface of the Rivière aux Rats is usually frozen from the beginning of December to the end of March, however, the safe circulation on the ice is generally done from mid-December to mid-March.

Description 
The Rats river flows more or less in parallel between the Chicoutimi River (west side) and the rivière du Moulin (east side).

The Rivière aux Rats begins, in the south, near boulevard du Royaume (route 170), passes near Rosaire-Gauthier Park, under Jean-Béliveau Park and empties into Saguenay River at the height of the rue de l'Hotel-de-Ville.

This watercourse was, in part, channeled in 1929 under the Chicoutimi Downtown.

In its southern part, a woodland protects its natural state. A  trail, accessible all year round, has been built along the Rats River: the Muscat Rats Trail.

Toponymy 
The toponym “Rivière aux Rats” was formalized on February 25, 1976, at the Place Names Bank of the Commission de toponymie du Québec.

Notes and references

Appendices

Related articles 
 Chicoutimi
 Saguenay (city)
 Saguenay River
 List of rivers of Quebec

Rivers of Saguenay–Lac-Saint-Jean
Geography of Saguenay, Quebec